The 1995 Ottawa Rough Riders finished 8th place in the North Division with a 3–15 record and failed to make the playoffs.

Offseason

CFL draft

Preseason

Regular season

Season standings

Regular season

Schedule

Awards and honours

1995 CFL All-Stars
None

Northern All-Stars
DT – John Kropke, CFL Northern All-Star
DB – Brett Young, CFL Northern All-Star

References

Ottawa Rough Riders seasons